Armand Marchant (born 14 December 1997) is a Belgian alpine ski racer. Marchant specializes in the technical events of Slalom and Giant slalom. Marchant made his World Cup debut on 13 December 2014. He competed at the 2015 World Championships in Beaver Creek, USA, in the Giant slalom and the Slalom.

Career
Marchant made his World Cup debut on 13 December 2014 in the Alta Badia giant slalom, he failed to finish the first run. At the 2015 World Championships in Beaver Creek he finished 41st in the Giant slalom and failed to finish the first run of the Slalom. On 11 December 2016 he scored his first World Cup points finishing 18th in the Val-d'Isère Slalom. On 5 January 2020 Marchant finished the 5th place at the Zagreb World Cup Slalom event.

World Cup results

Season Standings

Results per discipline

 standings through 8 February 2021

World Championship results

References

External links
 
 Armand Marchant World Cup standings at the International Ski Federation
 
 
 
 

1997 births
Belgian male alpine skiers
Living people
Place of birth missing (living people)
Alpine skiers at the 2022 Winter Olympics
Olympic alpine skiers of Belgium